Alan Curtis (November 17, 1934July 15, 2015) was an American harpsichordist, musicologist, and conductor of baroque opera.

Born in Mason, Michigan, Curtis graduated from studies at the University of Illinois, and received his PhD in 1960 with a dissertation on the keyboard music of Sweelinck.  He then relocated to Amsterdam to work with Gustav Leonhardt, with whom he subsequently recorded a number of Bach's concerti for harpsichord. In the 1960s and 1970s, he made a number of recordings of solo harpsichord music including albums dedicated to the keyboard music of Rameau and the works of Johann Sebastian Bach, such as his recording of the Goldberg Variations made on a 1728 Christian Zell harpsichord.

Following an academic career divided between UC Berkeley and Europe, Curtis devoted his time to performing dramatic music from Monteverdi to Mozart. As a student in the 1950s, he was the first modern harpsichordist to examine problems surrounding Louis Couperin's unmeasured preludes for harpsichord, and to commission the first modern copy of a chitarrone and the first chromatic (split-key) harpsichord constructed in the 20th century.  He also researched operas from the baroque and pre-baroque eras, using period instruments and authentic choreography.

In the late 1970s, Curtis founded the European ensemble Il complesso barocco, with which he made a number of commercial recordings for such labels as Virgin Classics, Deutsche Grammophon (Archiv), and Deutsche Harmonia Mundi.

References

External links
 "Alan Curtis, scholar, conductor and harpsichordist, dies aged 80".  Classical Music Magazine, 16 July 2015

1934 births
2015 deaths
American harpsichordists
American male conductors (music)
American performers of early music
People from Mason, Michigan
American musicologists
University of California, Berkeley College of Letters and Science faculty
University of Illinois at Urbana–Champaign School of Music alumni
20th-century American conductors (music)
21st-century American conductors (music)
Classical musicians from Michigan
20th-century American male musicians
21st-century American male musicians